Somewhere Called Home is an album by English jazz singer and lyricist Norma Winstone, recorded July 1986 at Rainbow Studio, Oslo, Norway, and released on the ECM label in 1987. It is often referred to as a classic vocal album.

Reception 
Tyran Grillo writes: "After her stunning contributions to ECM via the enigmatic outfit known as Azimuth, jazz vocalist Norma Winstone broke out, or should I say broke in, her solo career with Somewhere Called Home. Joined by pianist John Taylor and Tony Coe on clarinet and tenor saxophone, she lends her sympathetic draw to the canonic tree while also hanging it with her own lyric adornments to the music of Egberto Gismonti, Ralph Towner, and Kenny Wheeler. The finished session is burnished to a dim reflection of yesteryear." The Allmusic review by Stephen Cook awarded the album 4½ stars, stating: "It's not only a watermark of Winstone's career but, in the long line of modern vocal outings released since the romantic vocal tradition of Fitzgerald and Vaughan ended with free jazz and fusion, the disc stands out as one most original yet idyllic of vocal jazz recordings."

Track listing 
 "Cafe" (Egberto Gismonti/Norma Winstone) – 7:56
 "Somewhere Called Home" (Pat Smythe/Fran Landesman) – 4:22
 "Sea Lady" (Kenny Wheeler/Norma Winstone) – 4:23
 "Some Time Ago" (Sergio Mihanovich/Margaret Busby) – 5:38
 "Prologue" (Bill Evans/Norma Winstone) – 3:58
 "Celeste" (Ralph Towner/Norma Winstone) – 6:12
 "Hi Lili Hi Lo" (Bronislaw Kaper/Helen Deutsch) – 4:28
 "Out of This World" (Harold Arlen/Johnny Mercer) – 5:55
 "Tea For Two" (Vincent Youmans/Irving Caesar) – 4:55

Personnel

 Norma Winstone (voice)
 John Taylor (piano)
 Tony Coe (clarinet, tenor saxophone)

References 

ECM Records albums
1987 albums
Albums produced by Manfred Eicher